Prigorodny District is the name of several administrative and municipal districts in Russia:
Prigorodny District, Republic of North Ossetia-Alania, an administrative and municipal district of the Republic of North Ossetia-Alania
Prigorodny District, Sverdlovsk Oblast, an administrative district of Sverdlovsk Oblast

See also
Prigorodny (disambiguation)

References